Alan Rupert Tyrrell, QC (27 June 1933 – 23 October 2014) was a British lawyer and Conservative Party politician.

Biography
Alan Tyrrell was born on 27 June 1933. He was made a Queen's Counsel in 1976, and appeared in a number of controversial cases.

He was elected as Conservative member of the European Parliament for London East in 1979, but lost his seat in 1984, and was defeated again in 1989.

He later became a deputy high court judge.

Alan Tyrrell died on 23 October 2014.

References 

1933 births
2014 deaths
Conservative Party (UK) MEPs
MEPs for England 1979–1984
English King's Counsel
Politicians from London
20th-century English lawyers
Members of Gray's Inn
Alumni of the London School of Economics